Doug MacIver (February 20, 1953 - January 26, 2012) was a former professional Canadian football defensive lineman who played nine seasons in the Canadian Football League. He was part of the Grey Cup championship-winning Winnipeg Blue Bombers team of 1984.

References 

Career stats and bio

1953 births
2012 deaths
Canadian football people from Winnipeg
Players of Canadian football from Manitoba
Canadian football defensive linemen
Toronto Argonauts players
Saskatchewan Roughriders players
Winnipeg Blue Bombers players
Manitoba Bisons football players